Issam Makhoul (born 18 July 1952) is an Israeli Arab politician who served as a member of the Knesset for Hadash between 1999 and 2006. As the Secretary General of Maki, and together with the Central Committee of the party, he directs all communist activities in Israel as well as being responsible for relationships with communist parties in other countries. In late 2003, he was the target of a failed assassination attempt, when a car bomb exploded beneath his vehicle as his wife was backing it out of their driveway.

Biography
Born in Israel, Makhoul studied philosophy and sociology at the University of Haifa, gaining a BA. During his time at university he also became chairman of the National Union of Arab Students. After graduating he worked as a sociologist, and was a member of the Emile Touma Institute for Political and Historical Research. He is married to Suad.

Political career

Knesset activities
Makhoul was elected to the Knesset in 1999 on Hadash's list, and re-elected in 2003. He was an active critic of Israel's nuclear weapons program, and in 2000 was the first Knesset member to attempt a break in Israel's "nuclear ambiguity" policy by prompting an open debate on Israel's atomic program. He is also a supporter of Mordechai Vanunu, the former Israeli nuclear technician who was imprisoned for revealing details of Israel's nuclear weapons program to the British press in 1986, and had called for Vanunu's release on several occasions.

Assassination attempt
On 24 October 2003, Makhoul and his wife were preparing to leave their home in central Haifa; Makhoul took his Knesset-supplied Ford, and his wife took their personal Honda, Makhoul's primary transportation prior to Knesset service. Makhoul reversed the Ford out of the driveway, and his wife started the engine of the Honda, intending to pick up their twin children from school. The Honda's ignition sparked an explosion, flooding the vehicle in flames. Suad Makhoul escaped the blast unhurt. In May 2005, two young Jewish men (Alexander Rabinovitch and Eliran Golan) were convicted of obtaining explosive materials for criminal purposes. The two were conspiring to murder prominent Arab figures in Haifa, including Makhoul.

Current activities
Makhoul lost his seat in the 2006 elections. Since then he has been involved in improving ties between Maki and the Communist Party of China.

Married with two children, he lives in Haifa. His brother Ameer Makhoul was a director of the Haifa-based Ittijah, the Union of Arab Community-Based Associations.

References

External links

1952 births
Living people
Place of birth missing (living people)
Arab members of the Knesset
Hadash politicians
Israeli sociologists
Israeli trade unionists
Maki (political party) politicians
Members of the 15th Knesset (1999–2003)
Members of the 16th Knesset (2003–2006)
University of Haifa alumni